Hemiscolopendra is a genus of bark centipedes in the family Scolopendridae. There are about six described species in Hemiscolopendra, found in North, Central, and South America.

Species
These six species belong to the genus Hemiscolopendra:
 Hemiscolopendra chilensis Gervais, 1847
 Hemiscolopendra laevigata Porat, 1876
 Hemiscolopendra marginata (Say, 1821) (eastern bark centipede)
 Hemiscolopendra michaelseni Attems, 1903
 Hemiscolopendra perdita Chamberlin, 1955
 Hemiscolopendra platei Attems, 1903

References

Further reading

 
 
 

Scolopendridae